Wi Man (in Korean) or Wei Man (in Chinese) was a  Chinese-born Korean military general and monarch. He was originally a military leader of the Chinese Kingdom of Yan. When king Lu Wan of Yan was defeated by the Han in 195 BCE, Wi Man fled to Gojoseon in north-western Korea and later usurped power from its king in 194 BCE, establishing Wiman Joseon. Recorded in the Records of the Grand Historian and the Book of Han, Wiman was the first ruler in the history of Korea to have been recorded in documents from the same time period.

Biography 

After Emperor Gaozu of Han suppressed the rebellion of Zang Tu, king of Yan, he appointed general Lu Wan as Yan's new king. In 196 BC, Emperor Gaozu suspected Lu Wan of plotting rebellion and ordered an attack against Yan. Lu Wan fled to the Xiongnu while his general Wiman (Wei Man) led a thousand followers east to Gojoseon. He was initially ordered to fortify Gojoseon's northwestern border by King Jun of Gojoseon, however with the help of Yan refugees, Wiman usurped the throne (194~180 BCE). King Jun fled to Jin and called himself the "King of Han." 

Wiman's capital of Gojoseon was Wanggeom-seong, generally identified as Pyongyang. Since the Han dynasty was not completely stabilized yet, the governor of Liaodong appointed Wiman as an outer subject, provided that he did not prevent natives going up to the empire. The appointment is dated at 191 or 192 BCE. Having superior military strength, Wiman Joseon was able to subjugate the state of Jinbeon (진번, 眞番) and Imdun (임둔, 臨屯), vastly extending its borders. His kingdom was eventually conquered by Emperor Wu of Han in 108 BCE during the reign of Ugeo of Gojoseon.

Family 
Son and successor: name not recorded, second king of Wiman Joseon
Grandson: Ugeo (右渠), last king of Wiman Joseon
Great-grandson: Wi Jang (衛長),

References

Notes

Sources 
 Mikami Tsugio 三上次男: Kodai no seihoku Chōsen to Ei-shi Chōsen koku no seiji, shakaiteki seikaku 古代の西北朝鮮と衛氏朝鮮国の政治・社会的性格, Kodai Tōhoku Ajiashi Kenkyū 古代東北アジア史研究, pp. 3-22, 1966.
 Ibaragi Kazuo 荊木計男: Ei Man Chōsen ō Sakuhō ni tsuite 衛満朝鮮冊封について, Chōsen Gakuhō 朝鮮学報 (Journal of the Academic Association of Koreanology in Japan) Vol. 113, pp.1-25, 1984.
 Tani Toyonobu 谷豊信: Rakurō-gun no ichi 楽浪郡の位置, Chōsen shi kenkyūkai ronbunshū 朝鮮史研究会論文集 (Bulletin of Society for Study in Korean History), No 24, pp. 23-45, 1987.

2nd-century BC Chinese people
2nd-century BC Korean people
2nd-century BC rulers in Asia
Chinese emigrants to Korea
Early Korean history
Han dynasty generals
Korean generals
Wiman Joseon rulers